Blasiales is an order of liverworts with a single living family and two species. The order has traditionally been classified among the Metzgeriales, but molecular cladistics suggests a placement at the base of the Marchantiopsida.

Taxonomy
 Blasiales Stotler & Crandall-Stotler 2000
 Blasiaceae von Klinggräff 1858
 Blasia Linnaeus 1753
 Blasia pusilla Linnaeus 1753
 Cavicularia Stephani 1897 non Pavesi 1881
 Cavicularia densa Stephani 1897
 †Treubiitaceae Schuster 1980
 †Treubiites Schuster 1966
 †Treubiites kidstonii (Walton 1925) Schuster 1966

References

External links
 Liverwort Tree of Life
 Simplified phylogeny of the liverworts

 
Liverwort orders